Amin Saryana (born June 13, 1977) is an Indonesian former professional racing cyclist.

Major results

 2004
 2nd Overall Tour d'Indonesia
1st Stage 1

External links

1977 births
Living people
Indonesian male cyclists
Place of birth missing (living people)
Sportspeople from Jakarta